Joura Kalan is a village and one of the 51 Union Councils (administrative subdivisions) of Khushab District in the Punjab Province of Pakistan. It is located at 31°53'37N 72°13'39E.

References

History-Malik Khan Muhammad Joyia of Sher Garh Joyia Chairman Zakat Tehsil Nurpur Khushab Malik Ahmad Khan Joyia 
Landlord and Malik Jahangir Muhammad Joyia Adovicate of Joyia Goth Ahmadiyya malik Muhammad Ramzan joura

Union councils of Khushab District
Populated places in Khushab District